The Armed Forces Council is the senior military body of the Canadian Armed Forces. It meets to advise and assist the Chief of the Defence Staff (CDS) on all matters concerning the command, control, and administration of the forces, and generally meets once per month. It was created in 1964 to replace the Chiefs of Staff Committee in preparation for the 1968 unification of the Canadian Armed Forces. The Armed Forces Council is chaired by the CDS and consists of the following positions:

See also

 Chief of the Defence Staff (Canada)
 Defence Council of the United Kingdom
 Joint Chiefs of Staff

References

External links
 

1968 establishments in Canada
Canadian Armed Forces
Uniformed services of Canada